The National Indoor BMX Arena is an indoor BMX racing facility, located in Sportcity, Manchester, United Kingdom. The arena was designed by Ellis Williams Architects and built by contractors Sir Robert McAlpine. It is situated next to the Manchester Velodrome and the buildings share a common entrance as part of the National Cycling Centre. The arena cost £24 million to construct, seats 2,000 spectators and was opened in 2011. It is home to British Cycling’s BMX programme, which has produced world champions Shanaze Reade and Liam Phillips and Olympic champions Bethany Shriever and Charlotte Worthington.

Events
The arena hosted the first round of the 2013 UCI BMX Supercross World Cup.

References

External links 
  National Cycling Centre
 British Cycling
 NCC BMX Arena

Cycle racing in England
Sports venues in Manchester
BMX tracks
Cycling in Greater Manchester